The 2016 Johor Darul Ta'zim F.C. season is the 43rd season in club history and 4th season in the Malaysia Super League after rebranding their name from Johor FC.

Background

Background information
Johor DT won their second consecutive Malaysia Super League championship in the 2015 season. Johor DT were knocked out of the 2015 Malaysia FA Cup in the first round by Pahang, were knocked out of 2015 AFC Champions League in qualifying preliminary round 2 by Bangkok Glass and were knocked out of the 2015 Malaysia Cup in the quarter final by FELDA United. In 2015 AFC Cup, Johor DT becoming first Malaysian team to reach semi-final for the 2nd time in a row and AFC Cup Final. Johor DT are the champions of AFC Cup.

Appointment of new chairwoman 
On 27 July 2016, Tunku Tun Aminah binti Sultan Ibrahim, sister of club owner Tunku Ismail Sultan Ibrahim, has been appointed as the President of Johor DT.

Kit
Supplier: Adidas / Sponsor:  Forest City

Transfers
Mohd Azinee Taib, Azamuddin Akil, Rozaimi Abdul Rahman Juan Martín Lucero and Greek legend Vasileios Samios transferred to Johor FC. Samios has to proved his condition cause suffer of previous injury in his right knee. The injury cost him a remarkable career in Europe but hopefully he's going to do a restart with the Malaysian champions. 400 people attended in Johor FC training this morning and they spread their enthusiasm about the Greek striker. Samios waiting for physio report and if it's everything goes well, he will sign 1,5 years contract with total amount $150.000 plus bonus.

Friendly matches

Competitions

Overall

Overview

Malaysia Super League

Table

Results summary

Results by round

Malaysia Super League fixtures and results
Source:

Results overview

Malaysia FA Cup

Malaysia Cup

Group stage

AFC Champions League

Qualifying play-off

AFC Cup

Group stage

Knock-out stage

Round of 16

Quarter-final

Semi-final

Player information

Squad

Transfers and contracts

In

Out

Contracts

Appearances, and goals scored
Source:

|}

Note(s)

Top scorers

Hat-tricks

Top assists

Clean sheets

Discipline

Cards

Suspensions

Summary

Home Attendance

Matches (All Competitions) 
All matches played at Larkin Stadium.

Match(s) designated as Home Team, but not played at Larkin Stadium.

Attendance (Each Competitions)

See also 
 2016 Johor Darul Ta'zim II F.C. season
List of unbeaten football club seasons

References

External links 

Johor Darul Ta'zim F.C.
Malaysian football clubs 2016 season